Voices of Omens is the fourth full-length album release by Rwake. It is their first album released through Relapse Records.  It has a total playing time of 59 minutes and 6 seconds.

Musical style

The vocals are of a varied Death Metal style, varying from high shrieks to low growls and roars.
The music is monolithic, but is more fast-paced and up-tempo than Doom Metal.
The bass intertwines with the guitar, but is neither inaudible or emphasized.

Track listing

Personnel
Gravy (Guitar)
Jeff - (Drums)
C.T. - (Vocals)
Reid - (Bass)
B. - (Moog/Samples/Vocals)
Kiffin - (Guitar)

Critical reception
Pitchfork described it as "ingenious, forward-thinking metal." AllMusic called it "one of 2004's best and most intriguing heavy metal records".

References

External links
kvltsite.com review

Rwake albums
2007 albums